Tourville is a placename and derived surname of French origin which may refer to:

People
 Anne Hilarion de Tourville (1642–1701), French naval commander
 Camille Tourville (1927–1985), Canadian professional wrestler
 Charles Bertin Gaston Chapuis de Tourville (1740–1809), French general
 Glen Tourville, American soccer player and coach
 Henri de Tourville (1842–1905), French priest and sociologist
 Lester Tourville, fictional character in the Honorverse
 Rodolphe Tourville (1867–1927), Canadian politician

Places

Australia
 Cape Tourville, Tasmania
 Cape Tourville Lighthouse
 Tourville and Murat Bays Important Bird Area, South Australia

Canada
 Tourville, Quebec

France
 Tourville-sur-Arques
 Tourville-en-Auge
 Tourville-la-Campagne
 Tourville-la-Chapelle
 Tourville-les-Ifs
 Tourville-sur-Odon
 Tourville-sur-Pont-Audemer
 Tourville-la-Rivière
 Tourville-sur-Sienne

Ships
 French ship Tourville, several ships, including
 French cruiser Tourville (1926)
 French frigate Tourville (D 610)
 French ship Tourville (1788)
 Tourville-class frigate